Joshua Colin M. Herdman (born 26 March 1987) is an English actor and mixed martial artist, best known for playing Gregory Goyle in the Harry Potter film series.

Early life
Herdman was born in Hampton, London. The son of actor and former professional rugby league player Martin Herdman and Jessica Herdman, the youngest of the four brothers. He was educated at Orleans Park School.

Josh and his father Martin Herdman were involved in an motorcycle accident at 2:30 pm on the afternoon of 15 September 2015 on Staines Road, Hounslow while navigating a small roundabout. Their motorcycle skidded on oil and the two were thrown off, knocked unconscious and sustained injuries. Both were left waiting with police, who arrived shortly after the accident, for an ambulance for approximately 90 minutes after the accident. The police were reportedly unable to take them to a hospital in their cars due to the two men's injuries and a supposed lack of insurance coverage if something were to happen while en route. At some point, another ambulance had stopped and passed by but was unable to attend to them possibly because it had been full or was attending to another emergency. Eventually an ambulance arrived at 3:59 pm almost an hour and a half after the accident as other ambulances had been diverted to higher priority calls. They were taken to West Middlesex University Hospital. Martin Herdman suffered a torn ligament on his ankle and additional cuts and bruises.

Career 
Herdman started acting when he was about seven years old; his father found him an agent. At age 13, he was cast as Gregory Goyle, a sidekick of villain Draco Malfoy,  in Harry Potter and the Philosopher's Stone (2001). Over the next decade, he returned as Goyle in all seven sequels. He was originally considered for the role of Dudley Dursley, Harry's spoiled cousin, but it went to Harry Melling.

Herdman appeared as Righteous in the 2018 film Robin Hood, alongside Taron Egerton, Jamie Foxx and Jamie Dornan.

After five years of practising jiujitsu, Herdman began his MMA career on 23 April 2016 in Romford with a decision win over Janusz Walachowski. He said, "I chose MMA because I love the sport. It's raw, exciting and unpredictable. I find it more interesting than boxing although I appreciate the beauty and art in boxing. It also made sense to move onto MMA because of my jujitsu training. I would like a few amateur fights first to get me started and see where it goes from there, who knows?"

Filmography

Film

Television

References

External links

1987 births
English male film actors
Living people
Male actors from London
People from Hampton, London
21st-century English male actors
English male child actors
People educated at Orleans Park School